The 1905 Washburn Ichabods football team represented Washburn University during the 1905 college football season.

Schedule

References

Washburn
Washburn Ichabods football seasons
Washburn Ichabods football